Diego de Mazariegos y Porres ( conquistador. He conquered Chiapas in Mexico, and in 1528, together with Andrés de la Tovilla, founded San Cristóbal de las Casas (as Villa Real de Chiapa de los Españoles) and Chiapa de Corzo (as Villa Real de Chiapa de los Indios). He was the first Lieutenant Governor of Chiapas from 1528 to 1529.

See also
Spanish conquest of Chiapas

References

Spanish conquistadors
1536 deaths
Year of birth unknown